Marcus Arrecinus Clemens ( 1st century AD) was a prefect of the Roman imperial bodyguard, known as the Praetorian Guard.

Born in Pisaurum, Italy, Clemens came from obscure origins and according to the historian Suetonius, his family were of equestrian rank. He was the son of Arrecinus and wife Tertulla.

His wife is usually identified as Julia, the sister of Julius Lupus; Clemens' sister was Arrecina Clementina, also born in Pisaurum, Italy, c. 12, who became the wife of Titus Flavius Sabinus. His children were Marcus Arrecinus Clemens and Arrecina Tertulla, who became the first wife of the future Emperor Titus.

Clemens served as prefect from 38 to 41, during the reign of Emperor Caligula. Suetonius says that Caligula bullied Clemens, often in front of the guards. On 24 January 41, Clemens participated in the murder of Caligula, the Empress Caesonia, and their daughter, as well as in the proclamation of the next emperor Claudius.

References

1st-century Romans
Ancient Roman assassins
Clemens, Marcus
Flavian dynasty
People from Pisaurum
Praetorian prefects